Joan McCusker (born June 8, 1965 in Yorkton, Saskatchewan as Joan Elizabeth Inglis) is a Canadian curler and Olympic gold medallist.

Career 
McCusker's greatest successes in curling came during the years she played second on the team of Sandra Schmirler (skip), Jan Betker (third), and Marcia Gudereit (lead). In 1993, 1994, and 1997 they won the Scott Tournament of Hearts, the Canadian women's championship, the first Canadian women's team to win multiple times with the same lineup. As the Tournament of Hearts champions McCusker's team went on to represent Canada at the World Curling Championships three times and won each time. At the 1998 Winter Olympics McCusker and the rest of the Schmirler rink represented Canada, defeating Denmark to win the gold medal. The success of the team of Schmirler, McCusker, Betker, and Gudereit came to an abrupt end in 2000 when Schmirler died of cancer.

In 2000 McCusker and her teammates were inducted into the Canada's Sports Hall of Fame. In 2019 McCusker and her Olympic teammates were named the greatest female Canadian curling team of all time as part of a TSN poll of broadcasters, reporters and top curlers.

Personal life 
McCusker grew up with her 6 siblings on a farm near Saltcoats, Saskatchewan.  She comes from a family of curlers and her sisters Cathy Trowell and Nancy Inglis have also curled competitively at the provincial and national levels. Her husband Brian is also a curler and is a three time Saskatchewan champion. Joan and Brian have three children.

McCusker was an elementary school teacher until 1998, when she quit to focus on her curling and broadcasting career. Since 2001, McCusker has been part of CBC's curling coverage team, working with Bruce Rainnie and Mike Harris. She also is a motivational speaker.

She currently coaches the Casey Scheidegger rink.

References

External links
 

1965 births
Canadian women curlers
Canadian women's curling champions
Curlers at the 1998 Winter Olympics
Curlers from Saskatchewan
Curling broadcasters
Living people
Medalists at the 1998 Winter Olympics
Olympic curlers of Canada
Olympic gold medalists for Canada
Olympic medalists in curling
Sportspeople from Yorkton
University of Saskatchewan alumni
World curling champions
Canada Cup (curling) participants
Canadian curling coaches